This is a comprehensive list of victories of the  cycling team. The races are categorized according to the UCI Continental Circuits rules.

2010 Team NetApp

Stage 3 Tour de Normandie, Daniel Schorn
Stage 2 Tour Alsace, Alex Meenhorst
Stages 2 & 6 Okolo Slovenska, Daniel Schorn
Praha–Karlovy Vary–Praha, Andreas Schillinger

2011 Team NetApp

 Time Trial Championships, Daryl Impey
Porec Trophy, Blaž Jarc
Overall Tour of Hellas, Stefan Schäfer
Stages 3 & 4, Stefan Schäfer
Stage 7 Tour of Morocco, Daryl Impey
Stage 4 Cinturón Ciclista Internacional a Mallorca, Stefan Schäfer
Stage 1 Tour of Gallipoli, Blaž Jarc

2012 Team NetApp

 Time Trial Championships, Jan Bárta
Overall Settimana Internazionale di Coppi e Bartali, Jan Bárta
Stage 2b, Team time trial
Stage 5 (ITT), Jan Bárta
Rund um Köln, Jan Bárta
Neuseen Classics, André Schulze
Stages 2 & 3 Course de la Solidarité Olympique, André Schulze
Stage 5 Course de la Solidarité Olympique, Bartosz Huzarski
Grote Prijs Stad Zottegem, Matthias Brändle
Stage 6 Tour of Britain, Leopold König

2013 Team NetApp–Endura

Ronde van Drenthe, Alexander Wetterhall
Overall Szlakiem Grodów Piastowskich, Jan Bárta
Stage 2 (ITT), Jan Bárta
Stage 7 Tour of California, Leopold König
 Time Trial Championships, Jan Bárta
 Road Race Championships, Jan Bárta
British National Circuit Race Championships, Russell Downing
Grote Prijs Stad Zottegem, Blaž Jarc
 Overall Czech Cycling Tour, Leopold König
Stage 3, Leopold König
Stage 8 Vuelta a España, Leopold König

2014 Team NetApp–Endura

Clásica de Almería, Sam Bennett
Rund um Köln, Sam Bennett
Stage 5 Bayern-Rundfahrt, Sam Bennett
 Overall Tour of Slovenia, Tiago Machado
 Time Trial Championships, Jan Bárta

2015 Bora–Argon 18

Stage 6 Tour of Qatar, Sam Bennett
Stage 1 Giro del Trentino, Team time trial
Stages 1 & 3 Bayern–Rundfahrt, Sam Bennett
Stage 2 Arctic Race of Norway,  Sam Bennett
 Time Trial Championships, Jan Bárta
 Road Race Championships, Emanuel Buchmann
Paris–Bourges, Sam Bennett

2016 Bora–Argon 18

Stage 1 Critérium International, Sam Bennett
Stage 1 Tour d'Azerbaïdjan, Phil Bauhaus
Stage 5 Tour d'Azerbaïdjan, Michael Schwarzmann
Stage 2 Oberösterreichrundfahrt, Phil Bauhaus
Stage 4 Oberösterreichrundfahrt, Lukas Pöstlberger
 Road Race Championships, José Mendes
Rad am Ring, Paul Voss
Stage 5 Danmark Rundt, Phil Bauhaus
Stage 2 Giro di Toscana, Sam Bennett
Paris–Bourges, Sam Bennett

2017 Bora–Hansgrohe

Kuurne–Brussels–Kuurne, Peter Sagan
Stage 3 Paris–Nice, Sam Bennett
Stages 3 & 5 Tirreno–Adriatico, Peter Sagan
Stage 1 Giro d'Italia, Lukas Pöstlberger
Stage 2 Tour of California, Rafał Majka
Stage 3 Tour of California, Peter Sagan
Rund um Köln, Gregor Mühlberger
Stages 5 & 8 Tour de Suisse, Peter Sagan
 Overall Tour of Slovenia, Rafał Majka
Stages 1 & 4, Sam Bennett
Stage 3 Rafał Majka
 Time Trial Championships, Aleksejs Saramotins
 Time Trial Championships, Jan Bárta
 Road Race Championships, Gregor Mühlberger
 Road Race Championships, Juraj Sagan
 Road Race Championships, Marcus Burghardt
Stage 3 Tour de France, Peter Sagan
Stage 20 (ITT) Tour de France, Maciej Bodnar
Stage 1 Tour de Pologne, Peter Sagan
Stages 1 & 3 BinckBank Tour, Peter Sagan
Stages 2 & 4 Czech Cycling Tour, Sam Bennett
Stage 14 Vuelta a España, Rafał Majka
Grand Prix Cycliste de Québec, Peter Sagan
World Road Race Championships, Peter Sagan
Münsterland Giro, Sam Bennett
Stages 1, 2, 3 & 5 Tour of Turkey, Sam Bennett

2018 Bora–Hansgrohe

People's Choice Classic, Peter Sagan
Stage 4 Tour Down Under, Peter Sagan
Towards Zero Race Melbourne, Sam Bennett
Cadel Evans Great Ocean Road Race, Jay McCarthy
Gent–Wevelgem, Peter Sagan
Stage 3 Tour of the Basque Country, Jay McCarthy 
Paris–Roubaix, Peter Sagan
Stage 5 Tour de Romandie, Pascal Ackermann
Stages 7, 12 & 21 Giro d'Italia, Sam Bennett
Rund um Köln, Sam Bennett
Stage 2 Critérium du Dauphiné, Pascal Ackermann 
Stage 2 Tour de Suisse, Peter Sagan
 National Time Trial, Maciej Bodnar
 National Road Race, Peter Sagan
 National Road Race, Lukas Pöstlberger
 National Road Race, Pascal Ackermann 
 Points classification, Tour de France, Peter Sagan
Stages 2, 5 & 13, Peter Sagan
Grand Prix Cerami, Peter Kennaugh 
London–Surrey Classic, Pascal Ackermann
Stages 1 & 2 Tour de Pologne, Pascal Ackermann
Stage 1 (TTT) Czech Cycling Tour
Stage 6 BinckBank Tour, Gregor Mühlberger
Brussels Cycling Classic, Pascal Ackermann
GP de Fourmies, Pascal Ackermann
Stage 2 Okolo Slovenska, Rüdiger Selig
Stage 3 Okolo Slovenska, Matteo Pelucchi
Stages 2, 3 & 6 Tour of Turkey, Sam Bennett
Stage 2 Tour of Guangxi, Pascal Ackermann

2019 Bora–Hansgrohe

Stage 7 Vuelta a San Juan, Sam Bennett
Stage 3 Tour Down Under, Peter Sagan
Trofeo Andratx–Lloseta, Emanuel Buchmann
Clásica de Almería, Pascal Ackermann
Stage 7 UAE Tour, Sam Bennett
GP Industria & Artigianato di Larciano, Maximilian Schachmann
Stages 3 & 6 Paris–Nice, Sam Bennett
Bredene–Koksijde Classic, Pascal Ackermann
Stage 5 Volta a Catalunya, Maximilian Schachmann
Stage 7 Volta a Catalunya, Davide Formolo
Stages 1 (ITT), 3 & 4 Tour of the Basque Country, Maximilian Schachmann
Stage 5 Tour of the Basque Country, Emanuel Buchmann
 Overall Tour of Turkey, Felix Großschartner
Stages 1 & 2, Sam Bennett
Stage 5, Felix Großschartner
Eschborn–Frankfurt, Pascal Ackermann
Stage 1 Tour of California, Peter Sagan
 Points classification, Giro d'Italia, Pascal Ackermann
Stages 2 & 5, Pascal Ackermann
Stage 12, Cesare Benedetti
Stage 3 Critérium du Dauphiné, Sam Bennett
Stage 3 Tour de Suisse, Peter Sagan
Stage 1 Tour of Slovenia, Pascal Ackermann
 National Time Trial, Maciej Bodnar
 National Road Race, Maximilian Schachmann 
 National Road Race, Davide Formolo 
 National Road Race, Sam Bennett
 National Road Race, Juraj Sagan
 National Road Race, Patrick Konrad
 Points classification, Tour de France,  Peter Sagan
Stage 5 Tour de France, Peter Sagan
Stages 1 & 3 Tour de Pologne, Pascal Ackermann
Stages 1, 2 & 3 BinckBank Tour, Sam Bennett
Stage 2 Czech Cycling Tour, Shane Archbold
Stages 3 & 14 Vuelta a España, Sam Bennett
Stage 1 Deutschland Tour, Pascal Ackermann
GP de Fourmies, Pascal Ackermann
Gooikse Pijl, Pascal Ackermann

2020 Bora–Hansgrohe

Trofeo Serra de Tramuntana, Emanuel Buchmann
Clásica de Almería, Pascal Ackermann
Stage 1 UAE Tour, Pascal Ackermann
 Overall Paris–Nice, Maximilian Schachmann
Stage 1, Maximilian Schachmann
 Overall Sibiu Cycling Tour, Gregor Mühlberger 
Stages 1 & 3a, Gregor Mühlberger 
Stages 2 & 3b, Pascal Ackermann
Stage 1 Vuelta a Burgos, Felix Großschartner
Stage 4 Critérium du Dauphiné, Lennard Kämna
 National Road Race, Juraj Sagan
Stages 1 & 2 Tirreno–Adriatico, Pascal Ackermann
Stage 16 Tour de France, Lennard Kämna
Stages 1a & 3 Okolo Slovenska, Martin Laas
Stage 10 Giro d'Italia, Peter Sagan
Stages 9 & 18 Vuelta a España, Pascal Ackermann

2021 Bora–Hansgrohe

 Overall Paris–Nice, Maximilian Schachmann
Stage 5 Volta a Catalunya, Lennard Kämna
Stage 6 Volta a Catalunya, Peter Sagan
Stage 5 Tour of the Alps, Felix Großschartner
Stage 1 Tour de Romandie, Peter Sagan
Stage 2 Tour de Hongrie, Jordi Meeus
 Points classification Giro d'Italia, Peter Sagan
Stage 10, Peter Sagan 
Stage 2 Critérium du Dauphiné, Lukas Pöstlberger
Grosser Preis des Kantons Aargau, Ide Schelling
 National Time Trial, Maciej Bodnar
 National Road Race, Patrick Konrad
 National Road Race, Maximilian Schachmann 
 National Road Race, Peter Sagan
 Overall Sibiu Cycling Tour, Giovanni Aleotti
Prologue & Stage 3, Pascal Ackermann 
Stage 1, Giovanni Aleotti 
Stage 12 Tour de France, Nils Politt 
Stage 16 Tour de France, Patrick Konrad 
Stages 2, 3 & 5 Settimana Ciclistica Italiana, Pascal Ackermann
 Olympic Games Track Championships (Omnium), Matt Walls
Stage 2 Arctic Race of Norway, Martin Laas
Stage 4 Tour of Norway, Matt Walls
 Overall Deutschland Tour, Nils Politt 
Stage 1, Pascal Ackermann
Stage 3, Nils Politt 
 Overall Okolo Slovenska, Peter Sagan 
Gran Piemonte, Matt Walls
Paris–Bourges, Jordi Meeus

2022 Bora–Hansgrohe

 National Criterium, Shane Archbold
 Overall Volta a la Comunitat Valenciana, Aleksandr Vlasov
Stage 3, Aleksandr Vlasov
 National Road Race, Sergio Higuita
Stage 5 Vuelta a Andalucía, Lennard Kämna
Stage 5 Volta ao Algarve, Sergio Higuita
 Overall Volta a Catalunya, Sergio Higuita
Stage 3 Tour of the Alps, Lennard Kämna
 Overall Tour de Romandie, Aleksandr Vlasov
Stage 4, Sergio Higuita
Stage 5 (ITT), Aleksandr Vlasov
Eschborn–Frankfurt, Sam Bennett
  Overall Giro d'Italia, Jai Hindley
Stage 4, Lennard Kämna
Stage 9, Jai Hindley
Rund um Köln, Nils Politt
Stage 4 Tour of Norway, Marco Haller
Stage 5 Tour de Suisse, Aleksandr Vlasov
 National Time Trial, Felix Großschartner
 National Time Trial, Lennard Kämna
 National Road Race, Nils Politt
 National Road Race, Felix Großschartner
 Overall Sibiu Cycling Tour, Giovanni Aleotti
Stages 2 & 3a (ITT), Giovanni Aleotti
Stage 3 Tour de Pologne, Sergio Higuita
Stages 2 & 3 Vuelta a España, Sam Bennett
Bemer Cyclassics, Marco Haller
Stage 5 Tour of Britain, Jordi Meeus
Primus Classic, Jordi Meeus

2023 Bora–Hansgrohe

Stage 1 Vuelta a San Juan, Sam Bennett

Supplementary statistics
Sources

Notes

References

NetApp
wins